Hrubý Jeseník is a mountain range of Eastern Sudetes in northern Moravia and Czech Silesia. It is the second highest mountain range in the Czech Republic.

Its best known natural sights include:
Praděd, its highest mountain
A powerful pumped storage plant, Dlouhé stráně
Natural reserve Rejvíz, with moss lakes
The town of Jeseník – Priessnitz spa (from a strictly geomorphic point of view Jeseník lies in a valley that is an extension of Opawskie Mountains ("Zlatohorská vrchovina"), but being partially surrounded by Hrubý Jeseník, the town is commonly associated with it)
Devil Stones ("Čertovy kameny"), Peter's Stones ("Petrovy kameny")

Climate

Gallery

References

Mountain ranges of the Czech Republic
Sudetes
Geography of the Moravian-Silesian Region